Zernograd (literally "Grain town") is a town and the administrative center of Zernogradsky District in Rostov Oblast, Russia, located  southeast of Rostov-on-Don, the administrative center of the oblast. Population:

History

It was founded in 1915 as the halt of Verblyud due to the construction of the Rostov–Torgovaya railway. By 1933, it became a settlement and was renamed Zernovoy. It was granted town status in 1951 and renamed Zernograd in 1960.

Administrative and municipal status
Within the framework of administrative divisions, Zernograd serves as the administrative center of Zernogradsky District. As an administrative division, it is, together with ten rural localities, incorporated within Zernogradsky District as Zernogradskoye Urban Settlement. As a municipal division, this administrative unit also has urban settlement status and is a part of Zernogradsky Municipal District.

Military
From 1969 to 1995, Zernograd (air base) was home to the 106th Training Aviation Regiment, Yeysk Higher Military School of Pilots, of the Soviet Air Forces. The regiment was equipped with the L-29 and L-39 jet trainer aircraft. The airbase is now home to the 16th Army Aviation Brigade.

References

Notes

Sources

External links

Official website of Zernograd 
Zernograd Business Directory 

Cities and towns in Rostov Oblast